Curse of Xanathon is a Dungeons & Dragons adventure module designed by Douglas Niles for use with the D&D Expert Set. It was published by TSR, Inc. (TSR) in 1982 and is designed for 5–8 player characters of level 5–7.

Plot summary
Curse of Xanathon is an adventure in which the Duke of Rhoona begins issuing unusual decrees, such as ordering that the people must pay their taxes using beer instead of money, people must ride their horses backwards, and that dwarves must have their beards shaved and their bodies stretched to make them "presentable to human sensibilities". Duke Stephan is suffering from a curse which was brought upon him by Xanathon, chief cleric of the Ethengar Khanate immigrants living inside Rhoona's walls, and Stephen's own treacherous guard captain, Draco Stormsailer.

The player characters must discover the nature of the Duke's affliction. They will need to end the curse on the Duke so that he can lead his forces against an army of invaders. To do this, they need to find the antidote for the curse. They must battle Xanathon, Draco, and their minions to achieve this goal.

Lawrence Schick, in his sourcebook of roleplaying games, Heroic Worlds, describes the module as a town adventure in which the players are tasked with solving a mystery in order to remove a curse. The cursed town is threatened by a dwarven army, and the player characters must save the town.

Publication history
X3 Curse of Xanathon was written by Douglas Niles, with art by Tim Truman, and published by TSR in 1982 as a 32-page booklet with an outer folder. The module was designed as an adventure for 5th-7th level D&D characters. It was developed by Douglas Niles and Alan Hammack, and edited by Deborah Campbell Ritchie.

Reception

Doug Cowie gave the module a positive review in Imagine magazine. He called it a "welcome addition to the list of Expert Set modules", but nevertheless had some problems with it. The detective-style module requires the player characters to proceed in an orderly fashion through five scenarios. Cowie noted that "No party of players that I have known ever does what they are supposed to, in the right order, through five different adventures." The players are railroaded by a non-player character who "pops up whenever the party is going astray" and three of the five adventures are initiated by an appearance of the ducal herald. In spite of this, Cowie thought that "this is a good module to play", and he specifically praised the way the town is presented. He finished his review by calling it "a module rich in character and invention", and "although it is unlikely that any party will follow through the story line [...] without a lot of guidance, if the DM can avoid making the players feel over-manipulated, there will be much enjoyment to be had."

The module received 7 out of 10 overall in a review by Jim Bambra in issue No. 48 of White Dwarf magazine. He called Curse of Xanathon a "detective adventure", though he said that it was "very much a programmed affair" and "players move through a series of distinct and logical stages, discovering clues as they go." He noted that if the players fail to follow the clues, the Dungeon Master must direct them to the next encounter, which cuts down on the amount of freedom available to them. Bambra deemed the module to be not as good as the contemporaneous releases for Advanced Dungeons & Dragons, but said it was superior to the two modules preceding it in the series, Isle of Dread and Castle Amber.

References

External links
 http://www.rpg.net/reviews/archive/10/10780.phtml

Dungeons & Dragons modules
Mystara
Role-playing game supplements introduced in 1982